This is a list of members of the upper house of the Swedish parliament in 1891.

List of members of parliament 

Lists of members of the Riksdag
 
1891